"Black and Tan Fantasy" is a 1927 jazz composition by Duke Ellington and Bubber Miley. The song was recorded several times in 1927 for the Okeh, Victor and Brunswick record labels. The song was also featured in the 1929 short film Black and Tan. The Victor recording is an inductee of the Grammy Hall of Fame.

Recordings (1927–1942) 
 April 7, 1927 E-22299 issued on Brunswick 3526, Brunswick 6682, Brunswick 80002, Melotone M-12093, Polk P-9006, Vocalion 15556
 October 6, 1927 BVE-40155-2 probably unissued
 October 26, 1927 BVE-40155-4 Victor 21137, Victor 24861, Victor 68-0837 (as "Black & Tan Fantasie")
 November 3, 1927 W 81776-A Columbia (LP) C3L-27
 November 3, 1927 W 81776-B OKeh 40955
 November 3, 1927 W 81776-C OKeh 8521, OK 40955
 June 12, 1930 150590-1 Clarion 5331-C, Diva 6056-G, Velvet Tone 7082-V
 February 9, 1932 71836-2 (part of a three song medley), Victor Transcription L-16007
 February 9, 1932 71837-1 and 2 Victor rejected
 January 13, 1938 M-714-1 (greatly expanded arrangement as Prologue to Black and Tan Fantasy), Brunswick m8256
 January 13, 1938 M-715-1 (greatly expanded arrangement as The New Black and Tan Fantasy), Brunswick m8063

References 
 Victor recording of "Black and Tan Fantasy", Jazz.com. 

1927 songs
Jazz songs
Songs with music by Duke Ellington
Jazz compositions in B-flat minor